Jo Tongdal (June 6, 1945 – ) is a Korean pansori singer from Iksan, Jeollabuk-do. He is chairman of the Board of Sejong Traditional Arts Promotion Atheneum, Jo Tongdal Pansori Learning Center. His son is Korean singer Jo Kwanwoo. Jo Tongdal is a designated Korean human cultural asset.

Awarding
1987, Namdo Arts, President Award (hangul: 남도예술제 대통령상)
1972, 8th Jeonju Daesaseupnori Prize(hangul: 제8회 전주대사습놀이 장원)

References
 jjdss.or.kr 
 tcp.or.kr

South Korean male singers
1945 births
Living people